Events from the year 1988 in South Korea.

Incumbents
President: Chun Doo-hwan (until 24 February), Roh Tae-woo (starting 24 February)
Prime Minister: 
 until 25 February: Kim Chung-yul  
 25 February-2 March: Lee Hyun-jae (acting)
 2 March-5 December: Lee Hyun-jae
 starting 5 December: Kang Young-hoon

Events
September 17 - October 2 – 1988 Summer Olympics are held in Seoul.

Births
 January 7 - Lim Ju-eun, actress
 January 15 - Jun. K, vocalist (2PM)
 February 3 - Cho Kyuhyun, singer and actor
 February 16 - Kim Soo-hyun actor
 February 18 – Changmin, singer, songwriter and occasional actor
 February 20 - Ki Bo-bae, archer
 March 10 - Kang In-soo, singer
 March 12 - Kim Ji-yeon, fencer
 April 1 - Jung Hae-in, actor
 April 8 - Kim Myung-sung, baseball player
 April 14 - Kim Shin-wook, footballer
 April 25 - Dasuri Choi, dancer and entertainer based in the Philippines
 May 18 - Taeyang, singer and dancer
 May 24 - Jeon Yeong-Eun, athlete
 July 1 - Sun So-eun, swimmer
 July 12 - Inbee Park, golfer
 August 8 - Kim Min-jeong, judoka
 August 18 - G-Dragon, singer-songwriter, rapper and record producer
 September 6 - Kim On-a, handball player

Deaths

 September 18 - Heo Jeong, politician and Korean independence activist (b. 1896)

See also
List of South Korean films of 1988
Years in Japan
Years in North Korea

References

 
South Korea
Years of the 20th century in South Korea
1980s in South Korea
South Korea